Igloofest is an annual outdoor music festival which takes place at the Old Port of Montreal in Montreal, Quebec, Canada. Co-produced by Piknic Electronik and the Quays of the Old Port, it began in January 2007 and now draws crowds in the tens of thousands every year.

"One-Piece" Contest

Every weekend, a contest takes place in which the contestants show off their one-piece suits. The pictures are then posted on the official Igloofest website. The prize bundle can include anything from expensive winter clothing to rare V.I.P. tickets.

Notable Performances

 Ghislain Poirier (2007, 2008)
 Josh Wink (2008)
 Misstress Barbara (2008)
 Thomas Schumacher (2008)
 Lee Burridge (2009)
 Drop The Lime (2009)
 James Holden (2009)
 Modeselektor (2009)
 Adam Freeland (2009)
 Evil Nine (2009)
 Jesse Rose (2010)
 Adultnapper (2010)
 Mark Farina (2010)
 Renaissance Man (2010)
 Guy Gerber (2010)
 M.A.N.D.Y. (2010)
 Rusko (2010)
 Joris Voorn (2010)
 Nic Fanciulli (2010)
 Green Velvet (2012, 2017)
 Tiga (2012)
 Diplo (2012, 2019)
 A-Trak (2012)
 Carl Cox (2017)
 Gramatik (2019)
Rüfüs Du Sol (2020)
Nina Kraviz (2020)
Kaytranada (2020)

See also

List of electronic music festivals

References

External links
 Official website

Music festivals established in 2007
Music festivals in Quebec
Festivals in Montreal
Electronic music festivals in Canada